The George Mason–VCU rivalry is a college sports rivalry between the VCU Rams of Virginia Commonwealth University and the George Mason Patriots of George Mason University. Both universities are present members of the Atlantic 10 Conference, and for a majority of their rivalry history, members of the Colonial Athletic Association.

The rivalry has no specific name, although there are often referred to as I-95 rivals, referring to the main highway between Richmond and Fairfax.

History 
George Mason University's history dates back to 1949, when the University of Virginia opened a branch in Northern Virginia. The extension center offered both for credit and non-credit informal classes in the evenings in the Vocational Building of the Washington-Lee High School in Arlington, Virginia.

A resolution of the Virginia General Assembly in January 1956 changed the extension center into University College, the Northern Virginia branch of the University of Virginia. John Norville Gibson Finley served as director. Seventeen freshmen students attended classes at University College in a small renovated elementary school building in Bailey's Crossroads starting in September 1957. In 1958 University College became George Mason College.

The city of Fairfax purchased and donated  of land to the University of Virginia for the college's new site, which is now referred to as the Fairfax Campus. In 1959, the Board of Visitors of the University of Virginia selected a permanent name for the college: George Mason College of the University of Virginia. The Fairfax campus construction planning that began in early 1960 showed visible results when the development of the first  of Fairfax Campus began in 1962. In the Fall of 1964 the new campus welcomed 356 students.

During the 1966 Session of the Virginia General Assembly, Alexandria delegate James M. Thomson, with the backing of the University of Virginia, introduced a bill in the General Assembly to make George Mason College a four-year institution under the University of Virginia's direction. The measure, known as H 33, passed the Assembly easily and was approved on March 1, 1966, making George Mason College a degree-granting institution. During that same year, the local jurisdictions of Fairfax County, Arlington County, and the cities of Alexandria and Falls Church agreed to appropriate $3 million to purchase land adjacent to Mason to provide for a  Fairfax Campus with the intention that the institution would expand into a regional university of major proportions, including the granting of graduate degrees.

The origins of Virginia Commonwealth University begin in 1838, which was when the Medical department of Hampden-Sydney College was founded. By 1844, the Egyptian Building was erected, serving as the main building for the Hampden-Sydney Medical Department. The name "Egyptian Building" was coined due to its Egyptian revival style of architecture. Today, the Egyptian Building is the oldest building at VCU. While initially serving as a part of Hampden-Sydney, the department received an independent charter from the Virginia General Assembly in 1854 to become its own independent institution of higher learning. Subsequently, the department was rebranded as the Medical College of Virginia. The newly named Medical College (MCV) became a state-funded college in 1860, in return for a $30,000 appropriation. As a public school, the school has its first hospital constructed on campus the following year.

Throughout the American Civil War, the MCV became notable in being one of the few universities in the Confederacy to remain open and have a graduating class each year of the Civil War. The MCV is the only existing school in the Southern United States to have this special distinction. Closing out the 1860s, the school opened its first outpatient clinic. By 1879, the General Assembly grants the MCV the right to grant students degrees in Pharmacy. In the 1890s, several major additions to the MCV were added, such as the Pharmacy University College in 1893, the School of Dentistry in 1895, and the School of Pharmacy in 1898. From 1910 through 1965, the School became the independent Richmond Professional Institute, which merged with the Medical College of Virginia in 1968 to become Virginia Commonwealth University.

During the 1966–67 school year, the Patriots fielded their first athletic teams, while the Rams fielded their first athletic teams under their moniker two years later: in 1968–69. However, it was not until the 1981–82 season that both basketball programs would compete against each other.

All-time results

Men’s basketball

Men’s soccer

References 

College basketball rivalries in the United States
College soccer rivalries in the United States
College sports rivalries in the United States
College sports in Virginia
George Mason Patriots
VCU Rams
1981 establishments in Virginia
Sports rivalries in Virginia